Pamela Prati (until 2016 as Paola Pireddu; born 26 November 1958) is an Italian actress,  showgirl, model, singer, and television hostess. She has appeared in many television variety shows and in erotic comedies. She has hosted several programmes for Mediaset's Canale 5, including Scherzi a Parte and La sai l'ultima?. She is also credited as Pamela Field in some of her pictures.

Career 
Little is known about Prati's early life. She maintains that she was born from a Spanish flamenco dancer that later abandoned her Italian mother in Ozieri in the province of Sassari, northern Sardinia; however the Italian tabloid Chi has alleged that her father was in fact an Italian womanizer known as "Piscittu Murtu" (dead fish).

She moved to Rome in her late teens where she worked as a model and made a brief appearance on television in the variety show La Sberla in 1976. Prati attracted much publicity when she appeared on the cover of singer Adriano Celentano's album Un po' artista un po' no in 1980. That same year she debuted in her first film, La moglie in bianco... L'amante al pepe, an erotic comedy in which she had the starring role. This was followed by other films, and in the meanwhile Prati began to study dance, singing and diction. She soon joined the Bagaglino  Company, which was directed by Pier Francesco Pingitore and produced variety shows; Prati began making regular appearances on television as a showgirl and hostess, while she continued to act in films and television fiction. She has also performed on stage in theatrical productions.

Prati participated in three beauty contests in 1983, which included Mora più bella d'Italia, Miss Sardinia and Miss Universe.

In 1996, she released an album entitled Il tango delle 11. She also collaborated with Sandro Giacobbe on a single, "Mi innamoro di te" in 1999, and eight years later, in 2007, she released her most recent single, "Papelon".

In 1992, Prati hosted the Canale 5 variety programme Scherzi a Parte, and from 1992 to 1994, she presented La sai l'ultima?. She has also appeared on reality shows such as L'Isola dei Famosi 6 in 2008, which is the Italian version of Celebrity Survivor, and Grande Fratello VIP in 2016. In both reality shows she walked away before finishing the planned television schedule.

Filmography

Films

Television

Theatre 
 Beautiful Thing (2007)

Discography 
 Il Tango delle 11, (1996, album CD)
 "Mi innamoro di te", (1999, with Sandro Giacobbo, single)
 "Papelon" (2007, single)

References 

Official website

1958 births
Living people
People from Ozieri
Italian showgirls
Italian television personalities
Italian film actresses
Italian television actresses
Italian women singers